Euphaedra centralis is a butterfly in the family Nymphalidae. It is found in the Democratic Republic of the Congo, where it is only known from the central basin.

References

Butterflies described in 1985
centralis
Endemic fauna of the Democratic Republic of the Congo
Butterflies of Africa